Federal Route 144, or Jalan Kandang–Jasin–Chabau (formerly Melaka state route M27), is a federal road in Melaka state, Malaysia. The Kilometre Zero of the Federal Route 144 starts at Kandang.

Features
At most sections, the Federal Route 144 was built under the JKR R5 road standard, allowing maximum speed limit of up to 90 km/h.

List of junctions

References

Malaysian Federal Roads